"The People's Stick" is a political metaphor by 19th-century Russian anarchist Mikhail Bakunin used in his 1873 work Statism and Anarchy. The full quote states:
When the people are being beaten with a stick, they are not much happier if it is called "the People's Stick". 

The phrase is widely, though incorrectly, attributed to Noam Chomsky. Other scholars have also noted the phrase as emblematic of the inherent oppressiveness of a state power, even in a nominally socialist government.

See also 
 Doublespeak
 Euphemism

References 

Anarchist theory
Mikhail Bakunin
Political metaphors